Leaf or Leafe is a surname. Notable people with the name include:

Alexander Leaf (1920–2012), American physician and research scientist
Andy Leaf (born 1962), English footballer
Brad Leaf (born 1960), American-Israeli basketball player in the Israeli Premier League 
Caroline Leaf (born 1946), American filmmaker
Caroline Leaf (born 1963), cognitive neuroscientist, author and public speaker
Clifton Leaf, American journalist, editor of Fortune magazine
Daniel P. Leaf, retired United States Air Force lieutenant general
Dick Leafe (1891–1964), English footballer
Henry Leaf (1862–1931), British 1908 Olympic silver medalist in rackets
Herbert Leaf (1854–1936), English cricketer
Howard W. Leaf (1923–2009), US Air Force lieutenant general and fighter pilot
James Leaf (1900–1972), British Army officer and cricketer
Jonathan Leaf, playwright and journalist
Mary Leaf (1925–2004), Mohawk artist specializing in basketmaking
Mike Leaf (1961–2019), American college basketball coach
Murray Leaf (born 1939), American social and cultural anthropologist
Reg Leafe (1914–2001), English FIFA referee in the 1950s and early 1960s
Richard Leaf (born 1967), British actor
Robert Leaf (1936–2005), American composer
Ryan Leaf (born 1976), American former National Football League quarterback
Lindsay Leaf (born 1985), Juneau Jumper National and Jr. Olympic jump rope champion 
T. J. Leaf (born 1997), Israel-born American NBA basketball player
Walter Leaf (1852–1927), English banker, classical scholar and commentator on the Iliad and Odyssey

See also
Leef (disambiguation), includes list of people with surname Leef